Moreland railway station is located on the Upfield line in Victoria, Australia. It serves the northern Melbourne suburb of Coburg, and it opened on 9 September 1884.

History

Moreland station opened on 9 September 1884, when the railway line from North Melbourne was extended to Coburg. The station name comes from a Jamaican slave plantation that was run by the father and grandfather of land speculator Farquhar McCrae who, in 1839, acquired land between the Moonee Ponds Creek and Sydney Road.

On 2 May 1975, the former ground level station was damaged by fire.

In 1983, a number of sidings at the station were dismantled. In 1986, manually controlled boom barriers replaced interlocked gates at the former Moreland Road level crossing, which was located at the Up end of the station. In August 1988, former sidings "A", "B" and "C" and associated point work were abolished. Also abolished were the Up and Down end crossovers, and a number of disc signals.

On 7 May 2019, the Level Crossing Removal Project announced that the Moreland Road and Reynard Street level crossings were to be grade separated. On 14 December 2020, a new elevated station opened after the completion of these works, replacing the previous ground level station, which closed on 27 July 2020.

A footbridge was located at the Down end of the former ground level station, whilst a disused signal box is located below the Up end of the elevated Platform 2.

Platforms and services

Moreland has two side platforms. It is serviced by Metro Trains' Upfield line services.

Platform 1:
  all stations services to Flinders Street

Platform 2:
  all stations services to Upfield

Transport links

Moreland Buslines operates one route via Moreland station, under contract to Public Transport Victoria:
 : Essendon station – Ivanhoe station

Yarra Trams operates two routes via Moreland station:
 : to Glen Iris
 : North Coburg – Flinders Street station (Elizabeth Street CBD)

Gallery

References

External links

 Melway map at street-directory.com.au

Railway stations in Australia opened in 1884
Railway stations in Melbourne
Railway stations in the City of Merri-bek